Ambient Blue is the debut release and first EP by the American electronica band, Swimming With Dolphins. It was released on September 2, 2008.

In September 2013, Tofte did an interview with Chris Herlihy's weekly syndicated radio show and talked about the band in general, which included a look back at the EP.

Track listing

Personnel
Swimming With Dolphins
 Austin Tofte – vocals, keyboards, piano, synthesizers, programming, engineer, audio mixer
 Adam Young – keyboards, piano, synthesizers, programming, engineer, audio mixer
Additional musicians and production
 Breanne Düren – additional vocals on track 1, backing vocals on track 4

Notes
Shortly after the release, Adam Young left the band as Owl City's popularity began to increase.

References

2008 debut EPs
Electronica EPs
Swimming With Dolphins (band) albums
Indietronica EPs